Jidrin (also spelled Jadrin) is a Syrian village located in the Hirbnafsah Subdistrict in Hama District. According to the Syria Central Bureau of Statistics (CBS), Jidrin had a population of 1,215 in the 2004 census. Its inhabitants are predominantly Alawites. It was recorded as a Sunni Muslim village in 1838.

References

Bibliography

 

Alawite communities in Syria
Populated places in Hama District